The 1991 Darling River cyanobacterial bloom is the largest algal bloom on record. Parts of the river were sprayed with a Copper based algaecide using a crop duster.

References

1991 in Australia